A  (pl.  ) is an Old Russian oral epic poem. Byliny narratives are loosely based on historical fact, but greatly embellished with fantasy or hyperbole. The word  derives from the past tense of the verb to be and implies 'something that was'. The term most likely originated from scholars of Russian folklore (folklorists); in 1839, Ivan Sakharov, a Russian folklorist, published an anthology of Russian folklore, a section of which he titled "Byliny of the Russian People", causing the popularization of the term. Later scholars believe that Sakharov misunderstood the word  in the opening of the Igor Tale as "an ancient poem."

History 
Most scholars adhere to the version expressed by Vsevolod Miller that  as an old genre originated in the Russian North. According to Miller, the prototype of the Old Russian  were sacred northern legends, read according to a certain "bylinic technique", passed "from generation to generation, by the teacher to the student».

After Sakharov, there were numerous other anthologists who contributed to its development, particularly during the eighteenth century. For example, Kirsha Danilov produced a compilation of seventy . His sources were believed to be miners living in the Perm area. The works of these folklorists provided insights into the transition of the Russian literary tradition from one that was focused on religious subjects to secular literature. The texts that he was able to record are now preserved in the Bodleian Library at Oxford.     

Overall, interest in these epic poems continued to the point that comprehensive and wide-ranging materials were sourced from virtually all of Great Russia. Although these were preserved, according to Kahn et al., only those  from "northern Russia, the areas of Arkhangelsk, Olonetsk, the Onega region, and parts of Siberia" were actively preserved into the twentieth century.

Collections
 have been collected in Russia since the seventeenth century; initially they were published for entertainment in prose paraphrases. The Cossack Kirsha Danilov compiled the most notable of the early collections in the Ural region for the mill owner Prokofi Demidov in the middle of the eighteenth century. In the middle of the nineteenth century Pavel Rybnikov traveled through the region of Lake Onega and rediscovered that the  tradition, which was thought to be extinct, still flourished among the peasants of northwest Russia. A storm stranded Rybnikov on an island in Lake Onega where he heard the sound of a  being sung; he persuaded the singer to repeat the song and wrote down his words. He proceeded to collect several hundred , all of which he recorded from spoken paraphrase, and published them from 1861 to 1867 in several volumes entitled Songs Collected by P. N. Rybnikov.

Another influential collector, Alexander Gilferding, published one collection entitled Onega Bylinas Recorded by A. F. Gilferding in the Summer of 1871. He improved upon Rybnikov's work by transcribing the  directly from the sung performance rather than the spoken retellings. He noticed that the rhythm differed between the sung and spoken versions, and asked the performers to pause for a longer period of time between lines to allow him time to record the words from the song itself. He also organized his collection by singer rather than subject and included short biographical sketches of the performers with their collected songs, thus focusing on the singer's role in the composition of the song. Following the work of Rybnikov and Gilferding, many more scholars searched for  everywhere in northern Russia, and obtained  from the shores of the White Sea and the rivers flowing to the north.

Classifications
There are several ways to categorize , and scholars disagree on which classification to use. Scholars from the mythological school differentiate between  about 'older' and 'younger' heroes. The 'older' heroes resembled mythological figures, while the 'younger' heroes resembled ordinary human beings. The historical school classifies  based on the principality in which the story took place, as in Kievan, Novgorodian, and Galician-Volhynian cycles. The mythological  of giants and the like probably originated long before the Kievan state was founded, and cannot be classified easily by principality. Scholars of the historical school often consider mythological  separately. Other scholars group  based on content, including heroic, fairy tale type, novella type and ballad-. Most scholars prefer classification based on principalities.

Structure
Because of their nature as performed pieces,  singers employ basically linear and easy to follow structure.  structure typically includes three basic parts, introduction, narrative portion and epilogue. The introduction sometimes includes a verse to entice the audience to listen. Introductions often describe heroes at a feast being given a task or setting out on a mission. The narrative portion relates the adventure with exaggerated details and hyperbole to make the story more exciting. The epilogue refers to the reward for the mission, a moral or a reference to the sea, since byliny were often performed to attempt to calm the sea. To help listeners grasp the story, singers used 'tag lines' to preface speeches or dialogues, setting up for the audience who is talking to whom.

Common themes
Scenes common to  include a hero taking leave of his mother, saddling a horse, entering a council chamber, bragging, departing over the wall of a city, going on a journey, urging on his horse, in battle, dressing in the morning, exchanging taunts with an enemy, becoming blood brothers with another hero, and asking for mercy. Singers may use their telling of these scenes in many of their songs, incorporating different elements in song after song. Themes in many  include the birth and childhood of a hero, father and son fighting, battling a monster, the imprisoned or reluctant hero returning in time to save his city, matchmaking or bride taking, a husband arriving at the wedding of his wife, and encounters with a sorceress who turns men into animals.

Major characters and prototypes

Adaptations
Vasily Kalinnikov, a famous Russian composer from the nineteenth century composed an overture on this theme, . The music of the State Anthem of the Soviet Union and the Russian national anthem is also said to be inspired by the  tradition.

References

External links
 A collection of folk bylin in Russian

Epic poetry
Kievan Rus culture
Medieval poetry
Russian folklore
Russian poetry
Ukrainian literature
Medieval legends
Russian legends